Callum Preston (born 7 November 1995) is a footballer who plays as a goalkeeper.

He turned professional with Birmingham City, and had loan spells with Worcester City and AFC Telford United, but was released in 2015 without appearing for his parent club. He spent the next season with Crawley Town of League Two, for whom he made ten first-team appearances, and had a brief spell with National League North club  Altrincham in August 2016.

Although born in Stafford, in England, Preston has represented Wales at under-19 level.

Club career
Preston was born in Stafford, England, but was brought up in Welshpool, Wales, where he attended Welshpool High School and played for the local cricket club. He was on the books of both Liverpool and The New Saints before joining Birmingham City F.C.'s youth academy in 2008. He took up a scholarship in July 2012.

In 2014, he spent a short spell on work experience at Conference North club Worcester City, for whom he played twice, once in the league and once in the Worcestershire Senior Cup, while the club was without all its senior goalkeepers. He signed his first professional contract, of one year with the option of a second, in June 2014. In February 2015, Preston joined Conference Premier club AFC Telford United on a month's loan. He played in the final of the Shropshire Senior Cup, a 3–1 defeat to Shrewsbury Town's youth team, but remained an unused substitute in league matches.

At the end of the 2014–15 season, Birmingham decided against taking up their option for another year on Preston's contract. After a trial, he signed a one-year contract with League Two club Crawley Town. He began the season as second-choice goalkeeper, behind Newcastle United loanee Freddie Woodman, but when Woodman was away on international duty with the England under-19 team, he made his senior Crawley debut in the Football League Trophy. The match, on 6 October 2015, ended as a 3–0 defeat at home to League One visitors Southend United. With Woodman still absent, Preston made his Football League debut four days later in a 3–2 home win against Leyton Orient. The same day, Newcastle United goalkeeper Tim Krul suffered a ruptured anterior cruciate ligament, so Woodman was recalled by his parent club, leaving Preston as Crawley's only senior goalkeeper. Crawley signed the experienced Darryl Flahavan in Woodman's place, so Preston returned to the bench.

Preston returned to the starting eleven for the 2–1 win against Stevenage on 26 December, and kept his place for the next match two days later even though Flahavan's injured ankle had recovered enough for him to be named among the substitutes. After Flahavan took too long deciding whether to accept a contract extension, the club withdrew the offer, and Preston started the match away to Yeovil Town on 23 January 2016. At the end of the 2015–16 season, Preston was released by Crawley having made 10 appearances for the Sussex club.

On 3 August 2016, Preston joined National League North club Altrincham as competition for Andrew Dawber, but he played only once, in a 6–0 defeat at home to AFC Fylde on 16 August, and was released a few days later. He returned to the Football League in September, when he joined Stevenage of League Two as goalkeeping cover on non-contract terms.

In September 2017, Preston joined Wrexham on non-contract terms as cover for an injury to Chris Dunn.

After taking time out from football to concentrate on his degree in professional sports writing and broadcasting, Preston signed for Aberystwyth Town of the Welsh Premier League in January 2019. After playing one game for Aberystwyth in the Welsh Cup, Preston left the club.

International career
Preston made his international debut for Wales under-19s in a friendly against their Montenegrin counterparts in April 2014. He was placed on standby for the elite round European qualifiers in May but was not called upon.

Career statistics

References

External links

1995 births
Living people
Sportspeople from Stafford
People from Welshpool
Sportspeople from Powys
Welsh footballers
Wales youth international footballers
Association football goalkeepers
The New Saints F.C. players
Birmingham City F.C. players
Worcester City F.C. players
AFC Telford United players
Crawley Town F.C. players
Altrincham F.C. players
Stevenage F.C. players
Wrexham A.F.C. players
Aberystwyth Town F.C. players
National League (English football) players
English Football League players